Louis Walter Bauer (November 30, 1898 – February 4, 1979) was a Major League Baseball pitcher. Bauer played for Philadelphia Athletics in the 1918 season.

He played just one game in his career, giving up two runs, one of them earned, and two walks.

Bauer was born in Egg Harbor City, New Jersey and died in Pomona, New Jersey. He was the 6th youngest player in the 1918 season, at the age of 19.

External links
Baseball-Reference.com page

Philadelphia Athletics players
1898 births
1979 deaths
Baseball players from New Jersey
People from Egg Harbor City, New Jersey
Sportspeople from Atlantic County, New Jersey